Events from the year 1960 in France.

Incumbents
President: Charles de Gaulle 
Prime Minister: Michel Debré

Events
6 January – Manifesto of the 121 is published.
22 January – President Charles de Gaulle fires Jacques Massun, commander-in-chief of the French troops in Algeria.
24 January – A major insurrection occurs in Algiers against French colonial policy.
13 February – France tests its first atomic bomb in the Sahara.
23 March – Nikita Khrushchev meets Charles De Gaulle in Paris.
12 April – Eric Peugeot, youngest son of the founder of Peugeot, is kidnapped in Paris. Kidnappers release him 15 April in exchange for $300,000 ransom.
27 April – Togo gains independence from French-administered UN trusteeship.
11 May – The SS France is launched for the Compagnie Générale Transatlantique at the Chantiers de l'Atlantique shipyard in Saint-Nazaire by Yvonne de Gaulle.
3 June – The first Carrefour store opens in Annecy.
20 June – The Mali Federation between Senegal and Sudanese Republic (now Mali) gains independence from France.
5 August – Burkina Faso (Upper Volta) declares independence from France.
17 August – Gabon gains independence from France.
28 November – Mauritania becomes independent of France.
5 December – Pierre Lagaillarde, who led 1958 and 1960 insurrections in Algeria, fails to appear in a Paris court. He has reportedly fled with his four fellow defendants to Spain, en route to Algeria.
9 December – President Charles de Gaulle's visit to Algeria is marked by bloody riots by European and Muslim mobs in Algeria's largest cities, killing 127 people.
14 December – The OECD is formed in Paris.
27 December – France sets off its third nuclear test blast at its atomic proving grounds at Reggane, Algeria.

Arts and literature
25 March – Tom Pillibi by Jacqueline Boyer (music by André Popp, text by Pierre Cour) wins the Eurovision Song Contest 1960 for France.
10 November – Édith Piaf's recording of "Non, je ne regrette rien" is released.

Sport
26 June – Tour de France begins.
17 July – Tour de France ends, won by Gastone Nencini of Italy.

Births
23 January – Patrick de Gayardon, skydiver, skysurfer and a BASE jumper (died 1998)
18 March – Jean-Pierre Bade, soccer player
18 May – Yannick Noah, former tennis player, musician
15 June – Patrick Edlinger, rock climber (died 2012)
12 July – Corynne Charby, actress, singer and model
24 July – Catherine Destivelle, rock climber and mountaineer

Deaths
4 January – Albert Camus, author, philosopher, and journalist who won the Nobel prize in 1957 (born 1913)
13 March – Louis Wagner, motor racing driver (born 1882)
1 April – Madeleine Rolland, translator and peace activist (born 1872)
23 May – Georges Claude, engineer, chemist and inventor (born 1870)
14 July – Maurice, 6th duc de Broglie, physicist (born 1875)

See also
 1960 in French television
 List of French films of 1960

References

1960s in France